Muisne is a coastal town in the southwest of the province of Esmeraldas in northwestern Ecuador, with 5,925 inhabitants in the last Ecuadorian census in 2010. It is the seat of the namesake canton.

The town is located on the northern tip of the small coastal island known as Isla de Muisne in the Ensenada de Mompiche bay. The channel of the Muisne River estuary between the mainland and the eastern side of the island is crossed mainly by small outboard-motor boats for passengers and by barges for cars and small trucks.

On the western side of the island there is a beach which attracts both local and foreign tourists.

The canton of Muisne contains several other parroquias (small villages or parishes), including Pedro Carlo, San Francisco del Cabo (the oldest parish), Bunche, Union of Daule, Tola, Maldonado, Bellavista, and Daule.

See also 
2016 Ecuador earthquake

External links

 Marango.de -Social Work in Muisne
 Muisne.Net - The charming Island

Beaches of Ecuador
Populated places in Esmeraldas Province